Lisbet Dahl (born 9 April 1946 in Copenhagen is a Danish actress, instructor for the revue Cirkusrevyen. She has appeared in more than 50 Danish movies and TV-shows, and been on Danish TV numerous times. She is also known for playing Revue.

Dahl's various awards include a Danish knighthood and the country's lifetime achievement award for theatre.

Background 
Lisbet grew up in a family of actors; her mother is Danish actress Toni Biering and father is the actor Helge Dahl.
She was trained to be an actor at Aalborg Teater from 1965 to 1967.
She has been married four times and has five children. In an interview, she said "If I could change anything, I would only have had one man. I should never have get divorced."

Dahl's marriages were to Lars Høy (1970-1976), Preben Kaas (1977-1981, his death), Claus Wolter (1987-1992), and Stefan Fønns (1995-2000). Her children are Louise (1966), Jacob (1967), Martine (1970), Elisabeth (1984), Gustav (1990).

She wrote the book At overkomme livet (1999).

Dahl has received various awards and honours, during her career. She was honoured with the Danish order of chivalry, Knight of the Dannebrog, in 2000. Dahl received the Årets Dirch in 1981, a prize given to revue actors. She the lifetime achievement award for Danish theatre, the Reumert Prize of Honour, in 2016.

She is mentioned in Kraks Blå Bog (Krak's Blue Book), a Danish biographical dictionary service.

Theatrical career 
 Cabaret, Aalborg Teater (1969-1970) - Sally Bowles
 Hamlet, Aalborg Teater (1969-1970) - Ofelia
 Milord, Gråbrødrescenen (1981) - Edith Piaf
 Den grønne elevator, ABC Scenen (1986) - Blanny
 Sømænd og svigermor, Privat Teateret (2004-2005)

Revue 
 Rottefælden in Svendborg (1972)
 Cirkusrevyen (1974)
 Tivolirevyen (1998) - Instructor and actor
 Cirkusrevyen (2001 - ) - Instructor and actor

Selected TV-series 
 Sommer (The Summers) (2008) - Sofia Sommer
 Bryggeren (1996) - Nathalie Zahle

Selected filmography 
 Pigen og drømmeslottet (The Girl and the Dream Castle) (1974) - Tine
 Nøddebo Præstegård (Noedebo vicarage) (1974) - Andrea Margrethe
 Violer er blå (Violets are blue) (1975) - Lise
 Familien Gyldenkål (1975) - Woman working in tax office
 Spøgelsestoget (The ghost train) (1976) - Mrs Else Winther
 Blind makker (Dummy Partner) (1976) - Susanne
 Julefrokosten (The office party) (1976) - Henny
 Firmaskovturen (The Office Picnic) (1978) - Henny
 Fængslende feriedage (Holidays in jail) (1978) - Agnete, Henrys wife
 Forræderne (The traitors) (1983) - Gudrun, Bennedsens wife
 Op på fars hat (Walter and Carlo - up on daddy's hat) (1985) -Vera
 Høfeber (Hayfever) (1991) - Lise
 Sort høst (Black harvest) (1993) - Lig-Johanne
 Nonnebørn (Agnus dei) (1997) - Martha-Louise
 Men & Chicken (Mænd og Høns) (2015) - Susan

References

External links 
 
 Lisbet Dahl on Danish Film Database

Knights of the Order of the Dannebrog
1946 births
Danish actresses
Living people